In mathematics, the Manin conjecture describes the conjectural distribution of rational points on an algebraic variety relative to a suitable height function. It was proposed by Yuri I. Manin and his collaborators in 1989 when they initiated a program with the aim of describing the distribution of rational points  on suitable algebraic varieties.

Conjecture
Their main conjecture is as follows.
Let  
be a Fano variety defined
over a number field ,
let 
be a height function which is relative to the anticanonical divisor
and assume that 

Then there exists
a non-empty Zariski open subset 

such that the counting function
of -rational points of bounded height, defined by

satisfies

as 
Here

is the rank of the Picard group of 
and 
is a positive constant which
later received a conjectural interpretation by Peyre.

Manin's conjecture has been decided for special families of varieties, but is still open in general.

References 

Conjectures
Diophantine geometry
Unsolved problems in number theory